Glasco, as a person, may refer to:

 Charles Valentine Glasco, a retired New York City Police Sergeant.
Kimberly Glasco (b. 1960), a Canadian ballerina
Joseph Glasco (1925-1996), an American painter
Glasco, as a place, may refer to:

 Glasco, Kansas, a city in Cloud County, Kansas, United States
 Glasco, New York, a hamlet in Ulster County, New York, United States